CIGS may refer to:

 Chief of the Imperial General Staff, a pre-1964 military position in the British Army
 CIGS solar cell, a PV technology using CIGS absorber material (see next item)
 Copper indium gallium selenide (CuInxGa(1-x)Se2), a semiconductor absorber material for solar cells of same name
 Centro de Instrução de Guerra na Selva, a Brazilian Army Jungle Training Center and Combat School
 United Nations Convention on Contracts for the International Sale of Goods, a treaty that is a uniform international sales law.

See also
 Cigarette